Danielson Ferreira Trindade (born 9 January 1981), known simply as Danielson, is a Brazilian former professional footballer who played as a central defender.

He amassed Primeira Liga totals of 216 games and six goals over ten seasons, in representation of Rio Ave, Paços de Ferreira, Nacional, Gil Vicente and Moreirense.

Club career
Born in São Paulo, Danielson started his senior career with lowly Grêmio Esportivo Inhumense. In the middle of 2003 he moved to Portugal, spending the following five years with Rio Ave FC (the first three seasons in the Primeira Liga and the following two in the second division, with promotion in 2008).

In 2008, Danielson signed with Russian Football Premier League side FC Khimki. During his stint in the country, he claimed to have been arrested twice.

Danielson returned to Portugal the following January transfer window, being loaned to F.C. Paços de Ferreira. Subsequently, he returned to his previous club, was released, and re-signed with Paços on a one-year contract.

Danielson joined another Portuguese team in June 2010, moving to Madeira's C.D. Nacional. After one year in the Cypriot First Division with AC Omonia, he spent the next three seasons also in the Portuguese top flight with Gil Vicente F.C. and Moreirense FC; in the 2014–15 campaign, he was one of only three players to appear in every minute in the league.

At the age of 35, Danielson signed with C.D. Cova da Piedade of the Portuguese second tier. Until his retirement, he competed in the country's lower leagues and amateur football.

References

External links

1981 births
Living people
Footballers from São Paulo
Brazilian footballers
Association football defenders
Sociedade Esportiva do Gama players
Primeira Liga players
Liga Portugal 2 players
Campeonato de Portugal (league) players
Rio Ave F.C. players
F.C. Paços de Ferreira players
C.D. Nacional players
Gil Vicente F.C. players
Moreirense F.C. players
C.D. Cova da Piedade players
S.C. Salgueiros players
Berço SC players
Russian Premier League players
FC Khimki players
Cypriot First Division players
AC Omonia players
Brazilian expatriate footballers
Expatriate footballers in Portugal
Expatriate footballers in Russia
Expatriate footballers in Cyprus
Brazilian expatriate sportspeople in Portugal
Brazilian expatriate sportspeople in Russia
Brazilian expatriate sportspeople in Cyprus